Temimichat is a proposed impact crater in Mauritania.

Details
The Temimichat crater is located in northern Mauritania and has been listed together with other Mauritanian craters or crater-like features. Its diameter is about 700 m. According to Pomerol (1967), mafic rocks have been found in the area. Its age is still unknown, but the present erosional level suggests a relatively old age of formation.

See also
 Tenoumer crater
 List of possible impact structures on Earth

References

Impact craters of Mauritania